William Stith (1707  – September 19, 1755) was an early American historian and an Anglican minister.  He was the third president of the College of William & Mary (1752–1755), where Stith Hall was named for him.

Early life
Stith was the son of Captain John Stith and Mary Randolph, a daughter of William Randolph (1650– 1711). Stith's grandfather was Major John Stith, who participated in Nathaniel Bacon's rebellion.

Stith was educated at the College of William & Mary's Grammar School and The Queen's College, Oxford. On May 27, 1728, he received his B.A. degree. On April 12, 1731, while still in England, he was ordained a minister of the Anglican Church. He then returned to Williamsburg.

Career

In October 1731, he became a master of the College of William & Mary's Grammar School. He also began his role at the Virginia House of Burgesses as a chaplain. Stith was a minister for 16 years at the Henrico Parish in Henrico County beginning in 1736. He was also a minister in York County, Virginia of the York-Hampton Parish. In the 1740s and 1750s, three of his sermons were published.

The Sinfulness and Pernicious Nature of Gaming, 1752 was preached by Stith in Williamsburg before the Virginia General Assembly on March 1, 1752. The General Assembly had considered amending the 1748 Act for preventing excessive and deceitful gambling, but tabled the measure after hearing the sermon. The sermon was published in 1752 and became one of the best selling titles that year.

He is the author of one of the earliest histories of Virginia, The History of the First Discovery and Settlement of Virginia: being an Essay towards a General History of this Colony, published in Williamsburg by William Parks in 1747.

He was also the College of William & Mary's third president (1752–1755) and is the namesake of Stith Hall, a residence hall on the campus.

Marriage and children
He married his first cousin, Judith Randolph, the daughter of Thomas Randolph of Tuckahoe on July 13, 1738. They had three daughters: Judith, Elizabeth, and Mary.

Bibliography

Notes

References

1707 births
1755 deaths
Alumni of The Queen's College, Oxford
American historians
College of William & Mary alumni
College of William & Mary faculty
Presidents of the College of William & Mary
Randolph family of Virginia
18th-century American historians

Anti-gambling advocates
18th-century Anglican theologians